Samuel Phillip Viant  (5 January 1882 – 19 May 1964) was a British Labour Party politician.

Born in Plymouth, and educated at Devonport Higher Grade School, Viant worked as a carpenter and moved to London.  There, he became active in the abstinence movement and also in the Amalgamated Society of Carpenters and Joiners and the Independent Labour Party.  He studied at Paddington School for Social Science and Ruskin College.  He actively campaigned across the country for the Co-operative movement as well as the Independent Labour Party, and prior to 1914 served as vice chair of the  Conciliation Committee for the Building Industry. In 1915 he became a member of the Executive of the London Labour Party. Unsuccessful in gaining election to both Paddington and Willesden councils, Viant did become Vice Chairman of Paddington Trades Council.  At the 1918 general election, he stood unsuccessfully for the Labour Party in Willesden West.

Viant was finally elected to Willesden Council in 1919, and was elected as Member of Parliament (MP) for Willesden West at the 1923 general election.  He held the seat in 1924 and 1929, and was appointed Assistant Postmaster-General.  He lost his seat in 1931, but retook it in 1935, then held it until his retirement in 1959.  Viant also served as Chairman of Parliamentary Select Committee on public petitions. In 1960–1, he served as Mayor of Willesden.

Viant was named a Commander of the Order of the British Empire (CBE) in the 1948 Birthday Honours.

References

External links
 

1882 births
1964 deaths
Alumni of Ruskin College
Amalgamated Society of Woodworkers-sponsored MPs
British trade unionists
Labour Party (UK) MPs for English constituencies
Mayors of places in Greater London
Politicians from Plymouth, Devon
People from Willesden
UK MPs 1923–1924
UK MPs 1924–1929
UK MPs 1929–1931
UK MPs 1935–1945
UK MPs 1945–1950
UK MPs 1950–1951
UK MPs 1951–1955
UK MPs 1955–1959
Councillors in Greater London
Commanders of the Order of the British Empire